David Bader (born 22 December 1969) is a retired Swiss football defender.

While at FC Aarau he was part of the side that won the Swiss national title in 1992–93.

References

1969 births
Living people
Swiss men's footballers
FC Aarau players
FC Wangen bei Olten players
Association football defenders